Buitepos is a small settlement in the Omaheke Region in eastern Namibia. It is situated on the national road B6 which is part of the Trans-Kalahari Highway, and a border post between Namibia and Botswana. The proposed Trans-Kalahari Railway may pass through this place, too.

References 

Populated places in the Omaheke Region
Botswana–Namibia border crossings